Helena Ciak (born 15 December 1989) is a French basketball player for Lyon ASVEL and the French national team, where she participated at the 2014 FIBA World Championship. Ciak switched to Dynamo Kursk in 2016 and won with her team the EuroLeague.

References

External links

1989 births
Living people
Sportspeople from Dunkirk
French women's basketball players
Centers (basketball)
Basketball players at the 2016 Summer Olympics
Basketball players at the 2020 Summer Olympics
Olympic basketball players of France
French expatriate sportspeople in Russia
French expatriate basketball people in Russia
France women's national basketball team players
Medalists at the 2020 Summer Olympics
Olympic medalists in basketball
Olympic bronze medalists for France